Robert Williams (born 1940) is an astronomer who served as the Director of the Space Telescope Science Institute (STScI) from 1993 to 1998, and the President of the International Astronomical Union (IAU) from 2009 to 2012. Prior to his work at STScI, he was a Professor of Astronomy at the University of Arizona in Tucson for 18 years and the Director of Cerro Tololo Inter-American Observatory from 1986 to 1993.

Career 
As the Director of STScI, he decided to devote a substantial fraction of his Director's Discretionary time on the Hubble Space Telescope during 1995 to the study of distant galaxies. This historic project resulted in the Hubble Deep Field, a landmark image showing in remarkable detail the structure of galaxies in the early universe.  For his leadership of this project, he was awarded the 1998 Beatrice M. Tinsley Prize, the 1999 NASA Distinguished Public Service Medal   and the 2016 Karl Schwarzschild Medal.

A member of the American Academy of Arts & Sciences, Williams' research specialties cover nebulae, novae, and emission-line spectroscopy and analysis.  He is a strong advocate for science education and has lectured internationally on the discoveries of the Hubble Space Telescope.  In 1996, Williams made the controversial decision to offer Director's Discretionary time on the Hubble Space Telescope to two competing teams using distant supernovae to make an accurate determination of the expansion rate of the universe.  The two teams independently found that the expansion of the universe was accelerating due to a previously unknown source of energy.  The leaders of the two teams were awarded the 2011 Nobel Prize in Physics for this remarkable discovery.

References

External links 

 1995: Robert Williams Peers into Deep Space - Timeline of Everyday Cosmology, by the Carnegie Institution for Science.
 Starmus profile of Robert Williams

Winners of the Beatrice M. Tinsley Prize
1940 births
Living people
University of Arizona faculty
Presidents of the International Astronomical Union